Posthuman is the debut studio album by JK Flesh, a solo moniker of English musician Justin Broadrick, and was released on 7 May 2012 through 3BY3. Though Broadrick had been creating music under the title of JK Flesh since the early 1990s, Posthuman marked the first release of the project.

On 30 April 2012, the track "Knuckledragger" was released in advance of the album for streaming.

Background and composition
In 2010, Broadrick revived the band he was most known for, Godflesh, and toured with it. In 2011, his secondary shoegaze project, Jesu, released its third album. During this period of activity, Broadrick was creating and compiling material for his first solo electronic album. Posthuman, released on 7 May 2012, came out of those efforts, and, due to preceding any new Godflesh material despite the group being reformed, drew attention for being Broadrick's first album in some time to display the brutal heaviness his early music was known for.

Posthuman synthesizes two sounds that Broadrick had been known for: heavy, downtuned guitars paired with distorted vocals and electronic, dub- and hip hop-influenced beats. Broadrick said Posthuman allowed him to "bridge the gap" that existed between Godflesh and Techno Animal, his electronic project with Kevin Martin. On his employment of guitar for Posthuman, Broadrick said,

Broadrick later regretted the metal fusion on the record. In a 2018 interview he said "I submitted a lot of post-dubstep, techno, and peripheral sounds to the guy at the label and he was like, ‘God, this shit’s great! But imagine if you put some of your Godflesh guitar and vocals in there.’ In retrospect, I wish I just left the stuff minimal." He aimed to rectify this with the next release, Nothing Is Free.

Critical reception

Posthuman received favorable reviews. Brian Howe of Pitchfork appreciated the album's brutality and weight, writing, "Posthuman might not fully win back the crowd that Broadrick alienated with dreamy Jesu, but you can't deny that at least he's back to trying to blacken your eyes rather than put stars in them." Writing for The Quietus, Joe Kennedy praised the album's bleakness and surprisingly subtle employment of certain sounds. Pieter J. Macmillan of Drowned in Sound wrote, "If you’ve got a gap in your record collection for a record with the bite and bile of Godflesh and the swing and swagger of dubstep then Posthuman is just the thing to fill it." In a more lukewarm review, Ross Watson off The Skinny wrote, "Cold and detached, dark and demented, Posthuman is an unapologetically difficult listen. With its detached atmosphere and heavy basslines, it has its middle finger pointed firmly in the direction of the post-dubstep crowd, and will come as a welcome curio for fans of this most cultivated figure of underground music."

Track listing

Personnel
Adapted from the Posthuman liner notes.
 Justin Broadrick – instruments, production
 Shawn Joseph – mastering

Release history

References

External links 
 

2012 debut albums
Justin Broadrick albums
Albums produced by Justin Broadrick